Sarghis Baghdasaryan, also Baghdasarian (September 5, 1923 in Banadzor – June 19, 2001 in Yerevan), was a Soviet Armenian sculptor. He is best known for his 1967 work We Are Our Mountains, a monument carved into the tuff outside Stepanakert.  Locally, it is known as Mamik yev Babik (or "Granny and Grandpa").

References 

1923 births
2001 deaths
20th-century Armenian sculptors
Soviet sculptors
Soviet Armenians